Brooks Sports F.C. was an English football club based in Dewsbury, West Yorkshire.

History
The team participated in the Yorkshire Football League, Northern Counties East League and FA Vase.

References

Defunct football clubs in England
Defunct football clubs in West Yorkshire
Yorkshire Football League